Thomas Hoyne (February 11, 1817July 27, 1883) was elected Mayor of Chicago in 1876, but his election was later declared null and void by a Circuit Court. Prior to 1876, Hoyne had led a political career in which he had occupied numerous state and municipal offices.

Life and career
Hoyne moved to Chicago in 1837, where he turned his back on the mercantile life he had been leading and studied law, being admitted to the bar in 1839.  He was elected Chicago city clerk in 1840.  In 1853, he was appointed United States District Attorney for Illinois.  Six years later, he became a US Marshal for the northern district of Illinois.

In 1863, Hoyne traveled to New York and then to Boston  to acquire a lens for a telescope for the University of Chicago. In Boston, he met with Alvan Clark and purchased an 18½-inch lens and mounting for the Dearborn Observatory, at the time, the largest refracting telescope ever built. By 1866, he became one of the founding members of  the Chicago Astronomical Society and served as the organization's secretary.

Following the Great Chicago Fire of 1871, Hoyne presided at the meeting that established a free library in Chicago and sat upon its board of directors, eventually writing the first history of the Chicago library system.

In 1875, the city of Chicago adopted the Cities and Villages Act of 1872, which called for municipal elections to be held in April, instead of November.  Harvey Doolittle Colvin, the current mayor, was informed by his attorneys that his term should be considered extended to the new elections.  While the charter did not explicitly extend his term, it also failed to include the office of mayor in a call for special elections to fill the period from November to May.

Mayoral race

In April 1876 there was an election and neither the Republicans nor the Democrats nominated anyone for mayor.  Running as an independent, Hoyne received 33,064 of the 40,000 votes cast for mayor and was declared the Mayor of Chicago.

Colvin, however, refused to relinquish the office and was supported by the city comptroller.  Although Hoyne presided over council meetings and gave an inaugural address, the Circuit Court declared his election null and void.  Colvin continued to serve until the courts called for a special election on July 12, 1876.

Death and legacy
Hoyne was killed in a July 27, 1883 railroad collision on the Rome, Watertown and Ogdensburg railroad near Carlton Station Hoyne was buried in Carlton Station.

Hoyne Avenue in Chicago is named in his honor.

Personal life
On September 17, 1840 he wed Leonora Temple.

Hoyne's younger brother Philip Augustus Hoyne served as Clerk of the Recorder's Court of Chicago and (from 1853 until 1858) United States Commissioner for the District of Illinois. He also served on the City's Board of Education, serving two consecutive terms as its president.

References

External links
bio sketch

1817 births
1883 deaths
Politicians from New York City
Illinois lawyers
Mayors of Chicago
19th-century American politicians
19th-century American lawyers